Ekhtiarabad Rural District is a rural district (dehestan) in the Central District of Kerman County, Kerman Province, Iran. At the 2006 census, its population was 13,974, in 3,565 families. The rural district has 49 villages.

References 

Rural Districts of Kerman Province
Kerman County